Muhiuddin Khan Alamgir (born 1 March 1942) is a Bangladeshi politician. He is a Jatiya Sangsad member representing the Chandpur-1 constituency since 2008, and was Minister of Home Affairs from 2011 to 2013. He is also an economist, civil servant, and writer in Bangladesh.

Alamgir taught at the university until 1965. Joining the civil service that year, he served in numerous positions, for a total of 32 years. He held several positions with the Finance Ministry, in addition to regional posts. Beginning in the late 1990s, he was appointed to political positions when the Awami League was in power. He was detained without charges and tortured during 2002. An international effort helped obtain his release. He was arrested, charged and convicted in 2007 under a military caretaker government, and imprisoned until October 2008. In addition to writing and publishing development economics textbooks and numerous articles on this topic, Alamgir published his memoir My Days in Jail (2003).

Early life
Alamgir was born in 1942 in Kachua, Chandpur. completed his master's in economics from the University of Dhaka. Later he earned his master's and Ph.D. in development economics from Boston University.

Career
Alamgir started his career joining the faculty of the Department of Economics at the University of Dhaka in 1962. In 1965 Alamgir joined the Civil Service of Pakistan. Among other posts prior to the independence of Bangladesh, he served as the subdivisional officer at Naogaon. He was serving the Pakistani government as deputy commissioner of Mymensingh when the 1971 war of liberation broke out.

During Awami League rule in 1997, Alamgir was invited to join the cabinet as the State Minister for Planning. He also served stints in charge of the Civil Aviation Ministry and the Science and Technology Ministry. He was the initiator of the Fifth Five-Year Plan, which shaped Bangladesh's development policy from 1997 to 2002.

On 13 September 2012, during the administration of Sheikh Hasina of the Awami League, Alamgir accepted a ministerial post.

Imprisonment and torture
After BNP was returned to power in 2001, the party sought revenge for Alamgir's role in causing it to lose power in 1996. The government arrested Alamgir in 2002, detaining him without charges. He was tortured while in police custody. According to the American Association for the Advancement of Science, one of the groups that fought for his release, Alamgir later reported in court that
Every evening at midnight, the police would enter his cell and blindfold him. He was taken to a separate room where masked men interrogated and tortured him. They beat him with lathi (bamboo sticks) and glass bottles filled with water. He reported that he was beaten severely on his buttocks, feet and other muscular parts of his body, and was sodomized with the bottle. In addition, he was denied freshwater and his diabetes medicine. He reported that the police demanded that he sign a typed document. When he refused to sign, they continued to beat him.

A widespread international campaign pressured the government to stop the torture and to release Alamgir. Prominent politicians, such as United States Senator Edward Kennedy, United States Representative Frank Pallone, Jr., and others urged the government to release him. Professional and human rights organisations also pushed for his release, including the American Association for the Advancement of Science, Amnesty International, Asian Human Rights Commission, Committee of Concerned Scientists, New York Academy of Sciences, Organisation mondiale contre la torture (World Organisation Against Torture), 1997 Nobel Peace Prize Winners Physicians for Human Rights, Scholars at Risk, and South Asia Forum for Human Rights. Thousands of individuals from around the world wrote letters to the government about his case.

The High Court disputed the government's rationale for the former minister's detention without charge; in an unprecedented step, the Court issued an ultimatum to the government, demanding that it release Alamgir or risk having the High Court free him by force. The government released Alamgir on 18 September 2002, an hour before expiration of the court-ordered deadline. In December 2002 the BNP government filed a sedition case against Alamgir for his role in a widespread protest in 1996 against the elections of the previous year.

Re-imprisonment and release
On 4 February 2007, Alamgir was arrested from his home by civil and military police; the government had called a state of emergency in Bangladesh. Eventually the government charged him with corruption based on a wealth statement that he was forced to write while in jail and without access to lawyers or any documents. During the trial in July 2007, seven prominent persons, including well-known economists of Bangladesh and the United States, testified to his honesty. The summary tribunal set up by the military-led caretaker government convicted him of graft and sentenced him to 13 years imprisonment. All in all, the government filed six cases against Alamgir between February 2007 and October 2008.

On 21 October 2008, Alamgir was released on bail after being held in prison for 20 months by the military-backed caretaker government. In December 2008, the Awami League coalition won two-thirds of the seats in Parliament; Alamgir was among those elected while he was still on bail.

As a result of an appeal, on 13 July 2009, the High Court overturned Alamgir's conviction and sentence.

Controversy 
Alamgir faced controversy when he became the chairman of The Farmers Bank Limited while he was a government minister. Previous ministers resigned from their post to avoid conflicts of interest. When Bangladesh bank fined his bank, he as the chairman of the parliamentary standing committee on the public accounts asked  Comptroller and Auditor General to conduct a special audit on Bangladesh Bank.

Personal life
Alamgir's son Jalal Alamgir, an educationist in Massachusetts, died in an accident on 3 December 2011 at Pattaya, Thailand.

References

1942 births
Living people
People from Dhaka
20th-century Bangladeshi economists
University of Dhaka alumni
Boston University alumni
Academic staff of the University of Dhaka
Prisoners and detainees of Bangladesh
Bangladeshi torture victims
Honorary Fellows of Bangla Academy
State Ministers of Planning (Bangladesh)
9th Jatiya Sangsad members
10th Jatiya Sangsad members
11th Jatiya Sangsad members
21st-century Bangladeshi economists